Mount Joy, also known as the Peter Legaux Mansion, is a historic house in the Spring Mill section of Whitemarsh Township, Montgomery County, Pennsylvania.

It was built about 1735 by Anthony Morris for his son John, and is a -story, five bay, stone dwelling with a gambrel roof.  It has 10 fireplaces, some with iron firebacks.

Peter Legaux was the owner of "Spring Mill," a nearby gristmill that was in operation by 1704. The mill burned in 1967, and its stone ruins were demolished. Legaux also started the Pennsylvania Vine Company—which would become the first commercial vineyard in the US—on this property.

Mount Joy was added to the National Register of Historic Places in 1971.

References

Houses on the National Register of Historic Places in Pennsylvania
Houses completed in 1735
Houses in Montgomery County, Pennsylvania
National Register of Historic Places in Montgomery County, Pennsylvania